Aleš Mejač (born 18 March 1983) is a retired Slovenian footballer who played as a defender.

Honours

Koper
Slovenian Cup: 2006–07

Maribor
Slovenian PrvaLiga (6): 2008–09, 2010–11, 2011–12, 2012–13, 2013–14, 2014–15
Slovenian Cup (3): 2009–10, 2011–12, 2012–13
Slovenian Supercup (4): 2009, 2012, 2013, 2014

External links
Player profile at NZS 

1983 births
Living people
Sportspeople from Kranj
Slovenian footballers
Association football fullbacks
NK Triglav Kranj players
FC Koper players
NK Mura players
NK Maribor players
HNK Rijeka players
HNK Rijeka II players
Slovenian PrvaLiga players
Croatian Football League players
Slovenian expatriate footballers
Expatriate footballers in Croatia
Slovenian expatriate sportspeople in Croatia
Slovenia youth international footballers
Slovenia under-21 international footballers
Slovenia international footballers